Diogo Lézico da Silva (born 26 April 1983 in Amadora, Lisbon metropolitan area) is a Portuguese former professional footballer who played as a central defender.

References

External links

1983 births
Living people
People from Amadora
Sportspeople from Lisbon District
Portuguese footballers
Association football defenders
Liga Portugal 2 players
Segunda Divisão players
C.F. Estrela da Amadora players
F.C. Felgueiras players
Portimonense S.C. players
C.D. Olivais e Moscavide players
C.D. Santa Clara players
Associação Naval 1º de Maio players
S.C. Farense players
U.D. Oliveirense players
C.D. Trofense players
GS Loures players
Liga I players
Liga II players
FC Gloria Buzău players
FCV Farul Constanța players
FC Brașov (1936) players
Portuguese expatriate footballers
Expatriate footballers in Romania
Portuguese expatriate sportspeople in Romania